Antonina is an 1851 novel by Evgenia Tur, one of several Russian novels influenced by Jane Eyre. A first English translation by Michael Katz was published by Northwestern University Press in 1996.

References

1851 Russian novels